Myraida Chaves Carbia (March 12, 1960 – April 22, 2021) was a Puerto Rican show host, actress and television and theater producer. Chaves was the daughter of the well-known Puerto Rican actress, Awilda Carbia.

Early life
Chaves was the daughter of José R. Chaves and of Awilda Carbia, a Puerto Rican television actress. As a little girl, she attended Academia del Perpetuo Socorro in the San Juan area of Miramar (a subdivision of the San Juan suburb of Santurce). 

During the early 1970s, at the tender age of ten, Chaves was given an opportunity to appear on Puerto Rican television for the first time, when she substituted her mom in a canal 4 show named La Hora de la Aventura (Time for Adventure), where she played her mom's character's (Estrella Galaxia) daughter, Estrellita. In that show, she also shared credits with Cary Oliver.

Chaves soon began acting in school and theater plays, one of the better known ones where she participated was Solo en Oscuridad (Only When Obscure) where she worked alongside the well-known Puerto Rican rock singer Orvil Miller, among others.

Chaves moved to Boston, Massachusetts, in the United States, to complete her education. She earned a bachelor's degree in communication from Boston University in 1982.

Show business career
Returning to Puerto Rico, Chaves was hired by Puerto Rican television's canal 2, to host a show, alongside former Menudo member Rene Farrait, which was named Juventud '83 (Youth 83), a game show aimed at teenagers and college-aged young adults. Later, Fernando Sallaberry, another former member of Menudo, substituted Farrait as co-host of the show along with Chaves. By then, Chaves was becoming known in her native Puerto Rico, both as a budding television celebrity and as the daughter of Awilda Carbia. Juventud '83s name was changed to Juventud '84 in 1984. In 1985, canal 2 decided, in order so that they would not have to change the show's name every new year, to rename the show Adelante Juventud, and Chaves was joined by Braulio Castillo, hijo as her new show co-host.

Chaves tried her luck as a theatrical actress during 1984, participating in 40 Quilates (40 Carats), where she acted along with her mom and with Benito Mateo (who co-starred with her mom in a show named En Casa de Juanma y Wiwi), José Reymundi and Daniel Lugo, all of them experienced television actors. In 1985, Chaves acted in En Paños Menores (In Light Clothing), again with her mom and also with her television co-host Braulio Castillo Jr.

In 1986, Chaves became a television producer when canal 11 of Puerto Rico hired her to produce their nightly edition of their television news show, Las Noticias (The News). She soon joined Las Noticias'  on-camera staff as a news reporter herself. She also became a theatrical producer; one of her notable productions was named Desconcertados (Disconcerted, a play on the Spanish word for musical concerts, Concierto), in which her mom participated along with other well known Puerto Rican entertainers. Desconcertados was produced by Escarcha Inc., a company which was owned by Chaves and her siblings.

Chaves returned to canal 2 in 1993, when she and Jennifer Wolff began hosting Estudio 2, which served as a bridge for Chaves to later on join canal 2's news show, Telenoticias en Accion (Action News), once again, as a television reporter. 

Around that era, Chaves became an activist and she was active on media campaigns such as the anti-drug campaign, Dile Que No a Las Drogas (Say No To Drugs). Chaves also recorded a number of infomercials. Around that era also, she recorded a video named Nueva Ola Portoricensis (Puerto Rican New Wave), and started presenting, on Puerto Rican television, a mini-show aimed at educating Puerto Ricans about the history of television, named 45 Años de Historia (45 Years of History), which was produced by Paquito Cordero. The latter show lasted until July 4, 1999, when a special transmission was televised.

Towards the turn of the century, Chaves moved to WIPR, where she became a radio show host, on a show named Hoy 940 (Today 940). She then joined WIPR's television arm, WIPR-TV, canal 6, where, from March 12, 2002, she joined actress Linnette Torres on a program named En Tod@s (In Everything).

Myraida Chaves kept busy through the 2000s, her canal 6 show, En tod@s changing its name to Contigo (With You), with another Puerto Rican journalist, Isamari Castrodad, joining Chaves and Torres on-camera, while Chaves continued furthering her radio hosting career, on a show named Con El Pie Derecho (On The Right Side, but which literally translated to With the Right Foot instead) on a station named Magic 97.3, where she was, again, joined by Braulio Castillo, hijo.

In 2014, Chaves began a show named Uno a Uno (One on One), which was shown on canal 6. In this show, she became an interviewer and was able to interview several show business figures on national television. She also returned to theater as an actress, participating with Castillo, hijo, Castillo's brother Jorge Castillo, Marisol Calero, Lizmarie Quintana and Cristina Soler in a play named Aqui No Hay Quien Viva! (This Place is Impossible to Inhabit!).

During 2017, Chaves was named director of the Centro de Bellas Artes Angel O. Berrios in Caguas, Puerto Rico. Her period as director of that center was challenging: six months after her appointment, the center was impacted by hurricanes Irma and María. Chaves quickly began rehabilitating the center and soon after, it reopened for theatrical productions.

Health problems and death
Myraida Chaves was diagnosed with cancer late in her life. She received medical treatment both at Pavia and HIMA hospitals (the former in San Juan, the latter in Caguas), before passing away on April 22, 2021.

Some 30 years before, Chaves had suffered from cervical cancer but at that time, she had recovered.

Personal life
Unable to conceive her own children due to the cancer affliction she had when young, Chaves had an adoptive daughter named Myriana Ortiz, who was born in 1994.

Chaves was divorced.

See also 

 List of Puerto Ricans

References 

1960 births
2021 deaths
Puerto Rican actors
Puerto Rican television journalists
Boston University alumni